Cesare Sperelli (born 1639) was a Roman Catholic prelate who served as Bishop of Terni (1698–1720).

Biography
Cesare Sperelli was born in Assisi, Italy on 15 August 1639 and ordained a priest on 21 March 1676.
On 19 December 1698, he was appointed during the papacy of Pope Innocent XII as Bishop of Terni. On 28 December 1698, he was consecrated bishop by Fabrizio Paolucci, Bishop of Ferrara, with Prospero Bottini, Titular Archbishop of Myra, and Sperello Sperelli, Bishop Emeritus of Terni, serving as co-consecrators. He served as Bishop of Terni until his resignation on 11 December 1720. While bishop, he was the principal co-consecrator of François Amédée Milliet d'Arvillars, Bishop of Aosta (1699).

References

External links and additional sources
 (for Chronology of Bishops) 
 (for Chronology of Bishops) 

17th-century Italian Roman Catholic bishops
18th-century Italian Roman Catholic bishops
Bishops appointed by Pope Innocent XII
1639 births